Spånga is a community and parish in the borough of Spånga-Tensta in Stockholm County, Sweden.

Background 
Spånga was an independent municipality until January 1, 1949 when most of it was merged with the City of Stockholm, with smaller portions of the area merging with Solna, Sundbyberg, and Sollentuna municipalities.

Spånga was originally the name of a village centered on Spånga Church (Spånga kyrka), which dates to the 12th century.

Spånga is home to the largest TV studio in Sweden run by NEP Group which has 3 studio in total there, shows including Idol 2020 have been filmed there. Due to Covid-19 Melodifestivalen is considering using the studios for 2021 to film all 6 editions instead of the nationwide tour.

School 
Spånga high school was built 1928 and it is near Spånga station and Spånga market. There are about 600 pupils in the school right now.

Spånga elementary school has about 470 pupils today and there are grades 7 through 9. Spånga elementary school share premises with Spånga high school. This school also has a special course with boosted math and science subjects.

Politics 
Spånga IP hosts Järvaveckan, an annual event that invites speakers from Swedish political parties and other entities. It is similar to Gotland's Almedalen Week with more focus on Stockholm.

Sports 
The following sports clubs are located in Spånga:

 Spånga IS FK
 Turkiska SK
 Akropolis IF

Notable people 

 Dolph Lundgren

See also 

 Spånga-Tensta

References 

Geography of Stockholm
Västerort